Between 1997 and 1999 the international Cape Roberts Project (CRP) has recovered up to  long drill cores in the Ross Sea, Antarctica to reconstruct the glaciation history of Antarctica. Scientists from various institutes in seven countries have participated: Australia, Germany, United Kingdom, The Netherlands, Italy, New Zealand, and USA. After a seismic pre-site survey the area off Cape Roberts in the Ross Sea at the margin of the Transantarctic Mountains (77°S 163°43'E) was found to be suitable.

Drilling was performed using a conventional core wireline system with a drill derrick, protected by a cover against the rough climate. Four overlapping drill cores at three sites reflect in excellent quality the geological history and glaciation of the Antarctic during the last 34 million years.

As a logistic and scientific basis the American McMurdo Station and Scott Base of New Zealand were used. Supply of the drill site was performed with motor sledges and snow mobiles, exchange of personal with helicopters. The costs for the logistics were around US$4 million.

See also
 List of Antarctic field camps

Gallery

References

 Peter J. Barrett: Cape Roberts Project - Science Plan. 1998, S. 99ff (pdf 30MB)
 Barrett, Peter J; Fielding, Christopher R; Wise, Sherwood W (1998): Initial report on CRP-1, Cape Roberts Project, Antarctica, Terra Antarctica, 5(1), 187 pp,  hdl:10013/epic.28286.d001 (pdf 16 MB)
 Fielding, Christopher R; Thomson, MRA (1999): Studies from the Cape Roberts Project, Ross Sea Antarctica, Initial Report on CRP-2/2A, Terra Antarctica, 6(1/2), 173 pp
 Barrett, Peter J; Sarti, M; Wise, Sherwood W (2000): Studies from the Cape Roberts Project, Ross Sea, Antarctica, Initial Reports on CRP-3, Terra Antarctica, 7(1/2), 209 pp
 The first scientific results were published in the journal Terra Antartica (ISSN 1122-8628); see volume 5(3) 1998, 7(3+4) 2000, 8(4) 2001
 Further publications can be found in international journals, e.g. at Cold Regions Bibliography Project; (search for "Cape Roberts Project").
 Results from core analysis are accessible via the data library PANGAEA.

External links 
 Official Website'

Science and technology in Antarctica
1997 establishments in Antarctica